Daniel Claudiu Prodan (23 March 1972 – 16 November 2016) was a Romanian professional footballer who played mainly as a central defender.

In a career marred by injuries, he played mainly for Steaua București and represented the Romania national team in one World Cup and one European Championship.

Club career
Born in Satu Mare, Prodan came to prominence with national giants FC Steaua București, having signed in late 1992 from his hometown side FC Olimpia Satu Mare. With the capital club, he won five consecutive Liga I titles, almost always featuring as a starter; his debut in the league came on 8 November in a 3–1 win at FC Farul Constanța, aged 20.

In January 1997, Prodan moved to Spain with Atlético Madrid. He scored four La Liga goals in only half a season in 1996–97 (17 matches), and appeared in the same number of games in the next. However, it was noted that his disciplinary record was poor, including two red cards.

In the summer of 1998, Prodan joined Rangers (a club against which he had scored a memorable goal for Steaua in the UEFA Champions League in 1995) for £2.2 million, but made no first-team appearances in two-and-a-half years in Scotland due to a serious knee injury, which he sustained whilst with the Colchoneros. Rangers' doctor, Stewart Hillis, later revealed that no medical had been conducted, and the transfer was rushed to completion on the strength of falsified documents; the Glasgow club threatened to sue Atlético Madrid, but backed down and released the player in January 2001.

During the last five years of his career – Rangers included – Prodan only appeared in 33 matches combined while representing four teams, retiring at the age of 31 with FC Progresul București.

International career
Prodan won 54 caps for Romania between 1993 and 2001, and was in the squads for the 1994 FIFA World Cup (playing every minute at the tournament as the team reached the quarter-finals) and UEFA Euro 1996. His only international goal arrived on 12 November 1994, as he contributed with the winner in a 3–2 victory against Slovakia for the latter competition's qualifiers in Bucharest, with the points helping Romania qualify for the finals.

Personal life
Prodan's younger brother, Ciprian, was also a footballer. On 16 November 2016, Daniel died of a heart attack at the age of 44. The stadium from Satu Mare known as Stadionul Olimpia was renamed in February 2017 as Stadionul Daniel Prodan in his honor.

References

External links

1972 births
2016 deaths
Sportspeople from Satu Mare
Romanian footballers
Association football defenders
Liga I players
Liga II players
FC Olimpia Satu Mare players
FC Steaua București players
AFC Rocar București players
FC Progresul București players
La Liga players
Atlético Madrid footballers
Rangers F.C. players
Serie B players
A.C.R. Messina players
Romania under-21 international footballers
Romania international footballers
1994 FIFA World Cup players
UEFA Euro 1996 players
Romanian expatriate footballers
Expatriate footballers in Spain
Expatriate footballers in Scotland
Expatriate footballers in Italy
Romanian expatriate sportspeople in Spain
Romanian expatriate sportspeople in Scotland